Second Fleet or 2nd fleet may refer to:

 An organizational unit of the Republic of Korea Navy
 2nd Fleet (Imperial Japanese Navy)
 Legio II Adiutrix a legion of the Imperial Roman Army
 Luftflotte 2 a primary division of the German Luftwaffe in World War II
 Second Fleet (Australia) the second convict party sent to Port Jackson in 1790
 Second Fleet (United Kingdom)
 United States Second Fleet

See also
 
 
 
 
 Second (disambiguation)
 Fleet (disambiguation)
 First Fleet (disambiguation)
 Third Fleet (disambiguation)